The 2010 FC Tom Tomsk season was the 6th successive season that the club played in the Russian Premier League, the highest football league in Russia, in which they finished 8th. They also took part in the 2010–11 Russian Cup, reaching the Round of 32 where they were defeated by Krasnodar.

Squad

Transfers

Winter

In:

Out:

Summer

In:

Out:

Competitions

Russian Premier League

Matches

League table

Russian Cup

Squad statistics

Appearances and goals

|-
|colspan="14"|Players who appeared for Terek Grozny but left during the season:

|}

Goal Scorers

Disciplinary record

References

FC Tom Tomsk seasons
Tom Tomsk